Dana August Dimel (born October 9, 1962) is an American football coach and former player. He is the current head coach at the University of Texas El Paso. Previously he was the co-offensive coordinator and running backs coach at Kansas State University from 2009–2017.  Dimel has also coached at the University of Arizona and served as the head football coach at the University of Wyoming from 1997 to 1999 and at the University of Houston from 2000 to 2002, compiling a career college football record of 30–39.

Playing career 
Dimel played high school football at Upper Arlington High School in Upper Arlington, Ohio. He was named 1st team All-Central Ohio League as a defensive linemen in 1980. Dimel then played  at Hutchinson Community College before signing with Kansas State.

After one season on the defensive line, Dimel made the switch to offensive tackle for his final two years at Kansas State. He was named All-American by the National Strength and Conditioning Association. He was signed by the Minnesota Vikings as a free agent in June 1987 and released in August.

Dimel was named to the Kansas State all decade team for the 1980s.

Coaching career
Dimel was a long-time assistant during his first stint at Kansas State under legendary football coach, Bill Snyder from 1987 to 1996.  Dimel was instrumental in four consecutive Top 20 final rankings.  As the offensive coordinator in 1995 and 1996, the Wildcats won 19 games and finished #6 and #17 in the coaches' poll in respective years.

From 1997 to 1999, he coached at the University of Wyoming, and compiled a 22–13 record. At the time he became head coach, he was the youngest head coach in Division I-A.  After his rapid success at Wyoming, he became the head coach at the University of Houston. Previous success would not follow Dimel to Houston, however. During his 3 seasons in Houston (2000-2002), the Cougars compiled an 8–26 record—including an 0–11 season in 2001, the worst in school history.

In 2006, Dimel became the tight ends coach at the University of Arizona. In October 2006, he took over as running game coordinator for the team as well. After his promotion, the Wildcats beat three top 25 teams.

Dimel returned to Kansas State, and helped them to a 21–5 record over the 2011 and 2012 seasons.  The Wildcats finished in the Top 15 each season and quarterback Collin Klein was a finalist for the Heisman Trophy.  In 2012, Kansas State was crowned champions of the Big 12 and earned a trip to the Fiesta Bowl.

In December 2017, Dimel was named the head coach at UTEP.

Personal life 
Dimel is married to Julie Josephson Dimel. They have a son and daughter together. Their son Winston Dimel played fullback for his father at UTEP in 2018 after transferring from Kansas State.

Head coaching record

References

External links
 UTEP profile

1962 births
Living people
American football offensive tackles
Arizona Wildcats football coaches
Houston Cougars football coaches
Kansas State Wildcats football coaches
Kansas State Wildcats football players
Players of American football from Columbus, Ohio
Coaches of American football from Ohio
Sportspeople from Columbus, Ohio
UTEP Miners football coaches
Wyoming Cowboys football coaches